Elkhorn Creek or Elk Horn Creek may refer to:

Elkhorn Creek (Whitewater River tributary), a stream in Indiana and Ohio
Elk Horn Creek, a stream in Iowa
Elkhorn Creek (Kentucky), a stream in Franklin County
Elkhorn Creek (McDonald County, Missouri), a stream
Elkhorn Creek (Nodaway River tributary), a stream in Missouri
Elkhorn Creek (West Fork Cuivre River tributary), a stream in Missouri
Elkhorn Creek (Marion County, Oregon), a stream
Elkhorn Creek (Banister River tributary), a stream in Halifax and Pittsylvania Counties, Virginia
Elkhorn Creek (Tug Fork tributary), a stream in West Virginia